Caranavi Municipality is the first municipal section of the Caranavi Province in the La Paz Department, Bolivia. Its seat is Caranavi. The municipality, which had formerly contained the entire province, was reduced in size when the Alto Beni Municipality was created by Law 4131 on 23 December 2009.

References 

Municipalities of La Paz Department (Bolivia)